Herz is a lesbian bar in Mobile, Alabama run by Rachel and Sheila Smallman and owned by Rachel Broughton. It opened on October 4, 2019, and is the only lesbian bar in Alabama and one of only four in the south. The owners had explored different cities and states and been thrown out of at least one gay bar for being women before selecting Mobile as the ideal location for their bar.

The bar was featured as part of the Lesbian Bar Project, an initiative to preserve and highlight the remaining lesbian bars in the United States, and Queer to Stay, an LGBTQ+ business preservation project.

References

External links
official site

LGBT nightclubs in the United States
Organizations established in 2019
Mobile, Alabama
LGBT culture in the United States